The azure-breasted pitta (Pitta steerii) is a species of bird in the family Pittidae. It is a striking and colorful bird having colors of red, azure, green, black and white, It is endemic to the islands of Mindanao, Bohol, Leyte and Samar in the Philippines.  Its natural habitat is tropical moist lowland forest.  It is threatened by habitat loss.

Description and Taxonomy 
EBird describes the bird as "A medium-sized, long-legged bird of lowland and foothill forest floor and undergrowth in the southern Philippines. Green on the back, with a black head and back of the neck, a pale blue wing with a black edge, pale blue underparts with a black patch on the belly, and red under the base of the tail. Similar to Hooded pitta especially if viewed from the back, but has a pale blue chest and a white throat. Song is a short series of medium-pitched barks, “rak-rak-rak-rak-rak!”"

Subspecies 
Two subspecies are recognized:

 P. s. steeri – Found on Mindanao; Darker and has a stronger green tinge
 P. s. coelestis – Found on Bohol, Leyte and Samar; Paler in colour

Habitat and Conservation Status 
It is found in tropical moist lowland forest with dense understory up to 1,000 meters above sea level but more common below 600 meters. It prefers forests with limestone outcrops

IUCN has assessed this bird as Vulnerable with the population being estimated at 2,500 to 9,999 mature individuals remaining. This species' main threat is habitat loss with wholesale clearance of forest habitats as a result of logging, agricultural conversion and mining activities occurring within the range. The most effected part of its range is Bohol which only has 4% forest cover remaining.

Only a few areas are protected in Rajah Sikatuna Protected Landscape in Bohol and Samar Island Natural Park but actual protection and enforcement from illegal logging and hunting are lax.

Gallery

References

External links 
BirdLife Species Factsheet

Pitta (genus)
Endemic birds of the Philippines
Birds of Mindanao
Fauna of Bohol
Fauna of Leyte
Fauna of Samar
Birds described in 1876
Taxonomy articles created by Polbot